The Nepalese Civil War was a protracted armed conflict that took place in the former Kingdom of Nepal from 1996 to 2006. It saw countrywide fighting between the Nepalese royal government and the Communist Party of Nepal (Maoist), with the latter making significant use of guerrilla warfare. The conflict began on 13 February 1996, when the CPN (Maoist) initiated an insurgency with the stated purpose of overthrowing the Nepalese monarchy and establishing a people's republic; it ended with the signing of the Comprehensive Peace Accord on 21 November 2006. 

The insurgency was characterized by numerous war crimes and crimes against humanity, including summary executions, massacres, purges, kidnappings, and mass rapes. It resulted in the deaths of over 17,000 people, including civilians, insurgents, and army and police personnel; and the internal displacement of hundreds of thousands of people, mostly throughout rural Nepal. The Truth and Reconciliation Commission has received about 63,000 complaints, as reported by commissioner Madhabi Bhatta, while the Commission for Investigation of Enforced Disappearances has received around 3,000.

Overview

On 10 January 1990, the United Left Front (ULF) was formed, which, together with the Nepali Congress, was the backbone of the movement for democratic change. However, communist groups, uncomfortable with the alliance between the ULF and the Congress, formed a parallel front: the United National People's Movement (UNPM). The UNPM called for elections to a constituent assembly, and rejected compromises made by ULF and the Congress party with the palace. In November 1990, the Communist Party of Nepal (Unity Centre), or CPN(UC), was formed, and included key elements of the UNPM. On 21 January 1991, the CPN(UC) set up the United People's Front of Nepal (UPFN), with Baburam Bhattarai as its head, as an open front to contest elections. The CPN(UC) held its first convention on 25 November 1991; it adopted a line of "protracted armed struggle on the route to a new democratic revolution", and decided that the party would remain an underground party. In the 1991 election, the UPFN became the third-largest party in the Nepali parliament. However, disagreements within the UPFN surged, regarding which tactics were to be used by the party. One group, led by Pushpa Kamal Dahal (Prachanda), argued for immediate armed revolution, while the other group, led by Nirmal Lama, claimed that Nepal was not yet ripe for armed struggle.

On 22 May 1994, the CPN(UC)/UPFN was split in two. The militant faction later renamed itself the Communist Party of Nepal (Maoist), or CPN(M). This faction described the government forces, mainstream political parties, and the monarchy, as "feudal forces". The armed struggle began on 13 February 1996, when the CPN(M) carried out seven simultaneous attacks over six districts. Initially, the government mobilized the Nepal Police to contain the insurgency. The Royal Nepal Army was not involved in direct fighting because the conflict was regarded as a policing matter. On Friday, 1 June 2001, King Birendra, and his entire family were killed in a massacre at the Narayanhiti Palace – the official residence of the Shah monarchs. Perpetrated by Prince Dipendra, the heir apparent to the Nepalese throne, there were ten deaths and five injuries – four injured victims and one self-inflicted injury on Dipendra after shooting himself in the head in an apparent suicide attempt. Dipendra fell into a coma for three days before dying, during which he was crowned as the new king. On 25 July 2001, the government of Sher Bahadur Deuba and the Maoist insurgents declared a ceasefire, and held peace talks from August to November of that year. The failure of these peace talks resulted in the return to armed conflict, beginning with the Maoist attack on an army barracks in Dang District in western Nepal, on 22 November. The situation changed dramatically in 2002, as the number of attacks by both sides increased greatly, and more people died than in any other year of the war.

The government responded by banning anti-monarchy statements, imprisoning journalists, and shutting down newspapers accused of siding with the insurgents. Several rounds of negotiations, accompanied by temporary ceasefires, were held between the insurgents and the government. The government categorically rejected the insurgents' demand for the constituent assembly elections. At the same time, the Maoists refused to recognize the continued survival of a constitutional monarchy. In November 2004, the government rejected both the Maoists' request to negotiate directly with King Gyanendra rather than via Prime Minister Deuba, and the Maoists' request for discussions to be mediated by a third party such as the United Nations.

Throughout the war, the government controlled the main cities and towns, whilst the Maoists dominated the rural areas. In August 2004, the Maoists declared a week-long blockade of Kathmandu city which was later called off.

On 1 February 2005, in response to the inability of the relatively democratic government to restore order, King Gyanendra seized direct power and declared a state of emergency in an attempt to definitively end the insurgency. He proclaimed, "democracy and progress contradict one another... in pursuit of liberalism, we should never overlook an important aspect of our conduct, namely discipline." As a result of this takeover, the United Kingdom and India both suspended their material support for Nepal. According to reports by Nepali newspaper Kantipur, China supplied arms and military equipment to the Gyandera regime in November 2005; it was the first time China provided arms during the decade long conflict. On 5 May 2005, in response to the takeover by King Gyanendra, seven political parties began talks to form a Seven Party Alliance (SPA). On 22 November 2005, with support from the Indian government, Maoist rebels and the SPA jointly issued a 12-point resolution, which described autocratic monarchy as the main obstacle to "democracy, peace, prosperity, social upliftment and an independent and sovereign Nepal", and included a commitment to hold elections to a constituent assembly and for the Maoist rebels to renounce violence.

In 2006, violent conflict decreased significantly, and instead, resistance transformed to non-violent pro-democracy demonstrations. The municipal elections held in February were boycotted by seven major parties. Instead, over 70 minor political parties promoted candidates. Officially, voter turnaround was 20 percent. Throughout April, pro-democracy demonstrations were held across Nepal, and 19 demonstrators were killed, over 400 protesters were arrested, while dozens of others were injured. On 21 April, King Gyanendra announced that he would return governance to the SPA, but this offer was rejected by both the Maoist rebels and the SPA. On 24 April, King Gyanendra announced that he would also reinstate the House of Representatives, which satisfied the SPA, who formed the reinstated house. On 9 August, the government and the Maoist rebels agreed to accept the United Nations to monitor the peace process and to manage the arms of both sides. On 21 November, the government, the SPA, and the Maoist rebels signed the Comprehensive Peace Accord, which formally ended the civil war.

The Civil War forced young workers to seek work abroad, predominantly in the Persian Gulf and south-east Asia. The economy of Nepal is still heavily dependent on the infusion of foreign income from these migrant workers. As a result of the civil war, Nepal's tourism industry suffered considerably.

Timeline

13 February 1996 (1 Falgun 2052 BS, Tuesday): Initiation of "the people's war" by the Communist Party of Nepal (Maoist)
January 2001: The government creates the Armed Police Force, a paramilitary force to fight the insurgents.
28 May 2001 (15 Jestha 2058 BS, Monday): Chairman Prachanda gives an interview with the Communist journal A World to Win.
1 June 2001 (19 Jestha 2058 BS, Friday): King Birendra and most of the royal family were killed in the Nepalese royal massacre. Crown Prince Dipendra was accused of the massacre by the Incident Inquiry Committee consisting of Chief Justice Keshav Prasad Upadhaya, and the speaker of the House of Representatives, Taranath Ranabhat. Dipendra, supposedly comatose after a suicide attempt, is crowned king, according to tradition. He supposedly died on 4 June 2001. Gyanendra is then crowned King.
3 August 2001 (19 Shrawn 2058 BS, Friday): The first round of peace talks begin.
23 November 2001 (8 Mangshir 2058 BS, Friday): Peace talks collapse when the Maoists withdraw and launch a ferocious attack on Police and Army posts in 42 districts.
26 November 2001 (11 Mangshir 2058 BS, Monday): The government of Sher Bahadur Deuba declares a nationwide State of Emergency and deploys the Nepal Army.
US State Department declares Maoist political party as a terrorist organization. The United States Congress approves US$12 million to train Royal Nepal Army officers and supply 5,000 M16 rifles.
May 2002: Peace talks collapse.
May 2002: Large battles fought between Army and Maoist forces at Lisne Lekh along the boundary between Pyuthan and Rolpa districts, and in Gam village, Rolpa.
22 May 2002 (8 Jestha 2059 BS, Wednesday): King Gyanendra, acting on the advice of Prime Minister Sher Bahadur Deuba, dissolves Parliament and orders new elections. The reason given for the dissolution is opposition to the state of emergency.
11 July 2002 (27 Ashad 2059 BS, Thursday): Information leaks out that the Belgian weapon manufacturer FN Herstal is allowed to deliver 5,500 M249 SAW light machine guns to the Nepali monarchy, a decision made by all coalition parties. Minister of External Affairs Louis Michel speaks of "a country in a pluralistic democracy."
4 October 2002 (18 Ashwin 2059 BS, Friday): King Gyanendra deposes Prime Minister Deuba and the entire Council of Ministers, assumes executive power, and cancels the elections for the dissolved House of Representatives, which had been scheduled for 11 November 2002.
11 October 2002 (25 Ashwin 2059 BS, Friday): King Gyanendra appoints Lokendra Bahadur Chand as Prime Minister.
January 2003: The United States hold exercises with the Nepali army. Maoist insurgents kill the Inspector General of Armed Police, Krishna Mohan Shrestha, his wife and his bodyguard, Head Constable Subhash Bahadur Gurung of the Armed Police Force, while on their morning walk, as they used to do on Sunday mornings, intending to represent general safety to fellow citizens. The Inspector General and his wife, who was a teacher at an international school in the capital, were both unarmed. They were riddled with bullets from Type 56 Rifles and G3 rifles used by the Maoists.
29 January 2003 (15 Magh 2059 BS, Wednesday): A second ceasefire is established and peace talks begin.
13 May 2003 (30 Baishak 2060 BS, Tuesday): Code of conduct jointly declared by the government and the CPN-M for the mutually agreed period of cease-fire
17 August 2003 (32 Shrawn 2060 BS, Sunday): Nepali military and police forces kill 39 Maoist rebels in the Ramechhap district of central Nepal during an offensive launched jointly by the Army, Police, and Air Force of Nepal. 7 soldiers of the Nepali Army and 5 Constables of the Armed Police are also killed in the operation.
24 August 2003 (7 Bhadra 2060 BS, Sunday): The Maoists set an ultimatum, threatening to withdraw from the cease-fire if the government does not agree within 48 hours to include the question of the Maoists participating in the Constituent Assembly.
26 August 2003 (9 Bhadra 2060 BS, Tuesday): The Maoist ultimatum expires.
27 August 2003 (10 Bhadra 2060 BS, Wednesday):
Strike: The Maoist call for a three-day strike to denounce the Army's attacks on their cadres
The Maoists unilaterally withdraw from 29 January ceasefire. Prachanda's statement revives the rebels' demand for an end to monarchic rule in favor of a "people's republic", stating, "Since the old regime has put an end to the forward-looking solution to all existing problems through the ceasefire and peace talks, we herein declare that the rationale behind ceasefire...and peace process has ended."
28 August 2003 (11 Bhadra 2060 BS, Thursday): Maoist hitmen shoot two colonels of the Royal Nepal Army in their homes in Kathmandu, killing one and injuring the other.
29 August 2003 (12 Bhadra 2060 BS, Friday): Maoist insurgents unsuccessfully attempt to assassinate Devendra Raj Kandel, a Nepali minister.
31 August 2003 (14 Bhadra 2060 BS, Sunday): Maoist insurgents ambush a Nepalese police outpost in Rupandehi, killing 4 policemen.
2 September 2003 (16 Bhadra 2060 BS, Tuesday):  Maoist insurgents ambush a Nepalese police outpost in Siraha, killing 2 policemen and injuring four others.
27 September 2003 (10 Ashwin 2060 BS, Saturday): "Fifteen people including 8 rebels and 4 policemen were killed and suspected Maoists bombed five government utilities despite the guerrillas' plans for a nine-day truce from 2 October 2003, officials said. Eight Maoists were killed in a gun battle with security forces at Chhita Pokhara in the Khotang district, 340 kilometres east of Kathmandu, a police officer said. 4 Policemen were also killed. Elsewhere in eastern Nepal, the Maoists killed two policemen, Constable Purna Prasad Sharma and Head Constable Radha Krishna Gurung, and a woman selling beetle nuts, Kali Tamang, in the Jaljale-Gaighat area, an official said. 'A group of seven Maoists descended from a public bus when police were checking the passengers and suddenly opened fire from an automatic pistol, killing the three and wounding two others,' said Sitaram Prasad Pokharel, the chief administrator for the region. In Janakpur, an industrial hub on the Indian border 260 kilometres south-east of Kathmandu, the Maoists under the direct command of Prachanda carried out five early morning bombings that disrupted telephone service and power, police said. No one was killed directly by the blasts but an elderly man died of a heart attack after hearing the explosions, Police Deputy Superintendent Bharat Chhetri said. He said the sites that were bombed included the offices of the roads department and the Nepal Electricity Authority and a telecommunications tower. Police personnel and Maoists traded fire for nearly 40 minutes after the blasts but the rebels escaped and 37 people were injured, Mr Khadka said."
13 October 2003 (26 Ashwin 2060 BS, Monday): At least 42 Police Recruits and 9 Maoists are killed when an estimated 3,000 Maoists attempt to storm a Police Training Center in Bhaluwang. "'The rebels had snapped telephone cables, set up roadblocks by felling trees or blowing up highway bridges to prevent reinforcements from coming,' a witness, Krishna Adhikary, told Reuters."
Party chief Prachanda said, "We are sorry for the incident that took place against the policy of the party."
11 November 2003 (25 Kartik 2060 BS, Tuesday): The Ministry of Defence accuses the Maoists of abducting twenty-nine 9th- and 10th-grade students from Riva Secondary School in Mugu district, western Nepal during the previous week.
15 November 2003 (29 Kartik 2060 BS, Saturday): Four police officers, including Kamalapati Pant (Nepal Police Force), were shot dead from behind on a tea shop by two armed Maoist rebels who approached in a motorcycle and fled away immediately, in Nepalgunj.
19 November 2003 (3 Mangshir 2060 BS, Wednesday): According to a Nepal army official, four people were caught at the Chinese Khasa border point, 114 kilometers northeast of Kathmandu, smuggling weapons from Tibet into Nepal. The official named Hirala Lal Shrestha and Gyaljen Sherpa and said they were taken for interrogation in the Tibetan town of Xigatse.

2004
5 February 2004 (22 Magh 2060 BS, Thursday): An Army raid is carried out by the Bhairavnath Battalion on a village in Bhimad, Makwanpur district. Reports emerge that 14 suspected Maoist rebels and two civilians were executed after being captured. Amnesty International later wrote a letter to Prime Minister Surya Bahadur Thapa and Brigadier-General Nilendra Aryal, Head of the Royal Nepal Army (RNA) human rights cell, demanding an immediate inquiry.
10 February 2004 (27 Magh 2060 BS, Tuesday): Two central committee members of the CPN-M, Matrika Yadav and Suresh Paswan, are reported to have been handed over by India to Nepal. They were reportedly arrested in Lucknow after Nepal provided information.
13 February 2004 (1 Falgun 2060 BS, Friday): Ganesh Chilwal leads an anti-Maoist protest on this day, the eighth anniversary of the commencement of the revolution.
15 February 2004 (3 Falgun 2060 BS, Sunday): Ganesh Chilwal is shot dead in his Kathmandu office by two suspected Maoists.
15 February 2004 (3 Falgun 2060 BS, Sunday): Fighting erupts at a Maoist jungle base in Kalikot District, 360 km west of Kathmandu. The base is said to hold 5000 Maoist troops. On 17 February 2004, a security official says that a private helicopter flying troops to Kalikot was hit by Maoist fire but that it returned safely to Kathmandu. On 18 February 2004, 65 Maoists are reported to have been killed, though this conflicts with other reported death tolls of 35 and 48.
15 February and 16 2004: Nepalese state radio reports that 13 Maoist rebels were killed in seven separate small clashes with security forces across the country.
18 February 2004 (6 Falgun 2060 BS, Wednesday): Lawmaker Khem Narayan Faujdar, a member of the parliament dissolved by King Gyanendra in 2002, is shot dead by two suspected Maoists riding a motorcycle in the Nawalparasi District, 200 km southwest of the capital, according to the police.
2 April 2004 (20 Chaitra 2060 BS, Friday): The largest rallies since 1990 begin in Kathmandu. They are variously labelled "pro-democracy" and "anti-monarchy."
3 April 2004 (21 Chaitra 2060 BS, Saturday): More than 12 trucks are burnt while waiting at a western Nepal border post to pick up petrol from India. India condemns the attacks and vows to fight terrorism.
4 April 2004 (22 Chaitra 2060 BS, Sunday): "Some 150 demonstrators were struck during a police baton charge" during demonstrations in Kathmandu
4 April 2004 (22 Chaitra 2060 BS, Sunday): "Hundreds of Maoist rebels" attack a Police outpost in Yadukuwa, Jadukhola. 13 policemen are killed, 7 wounded, and 35 are listed as missing. 8–9 Maoists are also killed. "Witnesses said more than 500 rebels attacked the Police post and began firing Assault Rifles and RPG-7 rockets. at around 9 pm (1515 GMT) on Sunday night. The fighting lasted two to three hours."  Other reports state 400 rebels.
4 April 2004 (22 Chaitra 2060 BS, Sunday): In the west of the country three Indian traders are shot and injured and have their vehicles burned.
5 April 2004 (23 Chaitra 2060 BS, Monday): A three-day national strike begins, called by CPN(M) and opposed by an "alliance of five political parties" who are protesting in Kathmandu against the monarchy and say the strike will hamper the movement of demonstrators in Kathmandu. Prachanda said, "The time has come to win a united struggle against the feudal forces as the king is trying to take the nation back to the 18th century."
5 April 2004 (23 Chaitra 2060 BS, Monday): In the morning, 3 soldiers are killed and 7 injured by a CPN(M) landmine activated by their vehicle at Dhalkhola, 50 km east of Kathmandu.
5 April 2004 (23 Chaitra 2060 BS, Monday): At least 140 people are injured in clashes in Kathmandu as "about 50,000" demonstrators confront the police. Demonstrators try to break through a police barricade close to the royal palace. The police respond with tear gas and protesters are reportedly injured by police batons. Rocks and bricks are thrown by both sides. Demonstrations also occur in Lalitpur and Bhaktapur. Meanwhile, King Gyanendra has reportedly been away touring villages in western Nepal.
5 April 2004 (23 Chaitra 2060 BS, Monday): The Indian government announces that it will no longer provide police escorts to Indian officials shopping in Nepal, as a means to discourage such trips. Fears are based on the CPN(M) targeting Indians. "We are worried about possible reprisals here if the Maoists continue to target Indians inside Nepal," said a senior police official.
24 June 2004 (10 Ashad 2061 BS, Thursday): The nephew of former Prime Minister Surya Bahadur Thapa is hacked to death by Maoist insurgents in Dhankuta district.
16 August 2004 (32 Shrawn 2061 BS, Monday): The Soaltee Hotel, a popular luxury hotel in Kathmandu, is bombed, after refusing a demand from the Maoists that the hotel be closed.
18 August 2004 (2 Bhadra 2061 BS, Wednesday): A bomb explodes in a marketplace in southern Nepal. The blast kills a 12-year-old boy and wounds six others, including three policemen. In addition, Maoist rebels, demanding the release of captured guerrillas, stop all road traffic near Kathmandu by threatening to attack vehicles. Some Nepal businesses are shut down because of threats.
10 September 2004 (25 Bhadra 2061 BS, Friday): A bomb explodes at the United States Information Service office in Kathmandu.
13 September 2004 (28 Bhadra 2061 BS, Monday): U.S. Peace Corps suspends operations and non-essential U.S. Embassy personnel are evacuated from Nepal.
9 November 2004 (24 Kartik 2061 BS, Tuesday): 36 people were injured when suspected Maoist rebels exploded a powerful bomb at an under-construction government office complex, the Karmachari Sanchaya Kosh Office Complex in the heart of Nepalese capital Kathmandu Tuesday.

 11 November 2004 (26 Kartik 2061 BS, Thursday): Maoists kill NID Deputy Superintendent of Police Hemraj Regmi in front of his office residence in Butwal-6 in Rupandehi district.
15 December 2004 (30 Mangshir 2061 BS, Wednesday): Twenty government security personnel are killed in the western district of Arghakhanchi when the Maoists mount a surprise attack.
16 December 2004 (1 Poush 2061 BS, Thursday): Sixteen Maoist rebels are killed in clashes with Nepali security forces in the western district of Dailekh.
23 December 2004 (8 Poush 2061 BS, Thursday): Maoist forces launch blockade of Kathmandu.
26 December 2004 (11 Poush 2061 BS, Sunday): Over 15,000 hold peace rally in Kathmandu.

2005
2 January 2005 (18 Poush 2061 BS, Sunday): Nepali media reports two children being killed in Dailekh district by a Maoist bomb.
4 January 2005 (20 Poush 2061 BS, Tuesday): Three government security personnel and between two and twenty-four Maoist rebels reported killed in fighting.
8 January 2005 (24 Poush 2061 BS, Saturday): Maoists detain and later release 300 passengers from six buses that defy their blockade of Kathmandu.
10 January 2005 (26 Poush 2061 BS, Monday): Prime Minister Deuba said he would increase defense spending to fight the Maoists unless they come forward for talks with the government.
11 January 2005 (27 Poush 2061 BS, Tuesday): Protests and blockades over the government fuel price increases of between 10% and 25%.
15 January 2005 (2 Magh 2061 BS, Saturday): Maoists allegedly detain 14 Indian Gurkhas from Chuha village in Kailali.
29 January 2005 (16 Magh 2061 BS, Saturday): Government leader in the Lamjung district had been abducted and murdered with a gunshot to the head.
1 February 2005 (19 Magh 2061 BS, Tuesday): King Gyanendra dissolves the Deuba government and bans all news reports. The army begins arresting senior political leaders, journalists, trade unionists, human rights activists and civil society leaders. All telephone and internet connections are cut.
7 April 2005 (25 Chaitra 2061 BS, Thursday): Maoists attack a army base in Khara, Rukum suffering 300 losses.
6 June 2005 (24 Jestha 2062 BS, Monday): Badarmude bus explosion: Some 38 civilians are killed and over 70 injured after a packed passenger bus runs over a rebel landmine in Chitwan district.
9 August 2005 (25 Shrawn 2062 BS, Tuesday): Maoist rebels kill 40 security men in midwestern Nepal.
3 September 2005 (18 Bhadra 2062 BS, Saturday): The Maoists declare a three-month unilateral ceasefire to woo opposition political parties.
October 2005:: Chunbang Central Committee meeting in Rolpa decides to join hands with the political parties against the king
19 November 2005 (4 Mangshir 2062 BS, Saturday): After negotiations, the Maoist rebels agree to work with opposition politicians in a common front against the rule of King Gyanendra.

2006

2 January 2006 (18 Poush 2062 BS, Monday): Rebels decide not to extend a four-month ceasefire saying that the government had broken the ceasefire with numerous attacks on Maoist villages.
14 January 2006 (1 Magh 2062 BS, Saturday): Maoists launch coordinated attacks on five military and paramilitary targets in the Kathmandu valley, the first demonstration of their ability to organize violence within the Valley, prompting curfews at night for the next several days.
14 March 2006 (1 Chaitra 2062 BS, Tuesday): Nepali rebels extend road blockade; nationwide strike called for 3 April 2006.
5 April 2006 (23 Chaitra 2062 BS, Wednesday): General strike begins with Maoist forces promising to refrain from violence.
6 April 7, 2006: Protesters clash with police, hundreds arrested, dozens injured.
8 April 2006 (26 Chaitra 2062 BS, Saturday): A curfew is imposed in Kathmandu from 10 pm to 9 am The king orders protesters violating the curfew to be "shot on sight."
9 April 2006 (27 Chaitra 2062 BS, Sunday): General strike scheduled to end. Government extends curfew, BBC reports. Three dead in two days of unrest, as thousands of demonstrators defy curfews.
26 April 2006 (13 Baishak 2063 BS, Wednesday): The Maoists start to unblock streets and roads, but put forth some conditions.
27 April 2006 (14 Baishak 2063 BS, Thursday): Maoist insurgents, responding to a demand by the newly appointed prime minister Girija Prasad Koirala, announce a unilateral three-month truce after weeks of pro-democracy protests in Kathmandu, and encourage the formation of a new constituent assembly to rewrite the nation's constitution.
3 May 2006 (20 Baishak 2063 BS, Wednesday): Nepal's new cabinet declares a ceasefire. This was not taken very seriously. The cabinet also announces that the Maoist rebels will no longer be considered a terrorist group. Rebels are also encouraged to open peace talks.
21 November 2006 (5 Mangshir 2063 BS, Tuesday): Peace talks end with the signing of the Comprehensive Peace Accord between Prime Minister Koirala and Maoist leader Prachanda. The deal allows the Maoists to take part in government, and places their weapons under UN monitoring.

Aftermath
More than 17,000 people (including both civilians and armed forces) were killed during the conflict, including over 4,000 Nepalese killed by Maoists from 1996 to 2005, and over 8,200 Nepalese killed by government forces from 1996 to 2005. In addition, an estimated 100,000 to 150,000 people were internally displaced as a result of the conflict. Furthermore, this conflict disrupted most rural development activities. The revolution resulted in political, social and cultural change in Nepal.

Transitional justice bodies 
As a transitional justice mechanism, in July 2007, the Ministry of Peace and Reconstruction proposed legislation that would establish a Truth and Reconciliation Commission in Nepal. The parliament set up a Truth and Reconciliation Commission to investigate:"Murder, abduction and taking of hostage, causing mutilation and disability, physical or mental torture, rape and sexual violence, looting, possession, damage or arson of private or public property, forced eviction from house and land or any other kind of displacement, and any kind of inhuman acts inconsistent with the international human rights or humanitarian law or other crimes against humanity."Also another commission to investigate on forced disappearances and debated proposals to grant an amnesty for abuses by government and rebel forces. Both commissions were established in 2013. However, the government led by the NCP, did not extend the tenure of the working commission, dismissed it, and allegedly formed a new commission in its favor.

In 2016, commissioner Madhabi Bhatta of the TRC, a hardliner advocating that amnesty will not be given to perpetrators of serious crimes and that no one has immunity, said on national television that even Prachanda, the then-Prime Minister and former supreme commander of the guerrillas, will be questioned by the commission, reporting that she felt security threats from the former extremists.

Army integration
The Nepalese Army took final control over the People's Liberation Army (PLA), the armed wing of the CPN (Maoist), on 10 April 2012. Then Prime Minister Baburam Bhattarai, who also headed the Army Integration Special Committee (AISC), told the committee on 10 April 2012, that the NA was going to move into all 15 PLA cantonments, take full control, and take control of more than 3,000 weapons locked in containers there. A total of 6,576 combatants chose the Voluntary Retirement Scheme (VRS), that promised cheques in the range of NPR 500,000 to NPR 800,000, depending on their rank.

In the first phase (18 November – 1 December 2011) of regrouping, 9,705 former combatants had chosen integration into the NA. In a landmark achievement, the AISC had initiated the process of integration following a 1 November 2011, seven-point deal signed by three major political parties – UCPN-M, Communist Party of Nepal (Unified Marxist-Leninist) (CPN-UML) and Nepali Congress (NC) – and the umbrella formation of several Madheshi groups, the United Democratic Madhesi Front (UDMF). The deal provided three options to former PLA combatants – integration, voluntary retirement and rehabilitation. 9,705 combatants opted for integration, 7,286 chose voluntary discharge, and six combatants registered their names for rehabilitation packages. The United Nations Mission in Nepal (UNMIN) had registered 19,602 combatants in the second verification conducted on 26 May 2007. Leaked footage of Prachanda was later telecasted by Image Channel on 5 May 2009, in which Parchanda claims to have given the UNMIN an inflated number of Maoist fighters.

On 14 April 2012, AISC decision laid down that the ranks of the integrated combatants would be determined according to the NA's, and not the PLA's, standards. A selection committee would be headed by the chairman of Nepal's Public Service Commission (PSC) or by a member appointed by him, and a General Directorate would be created under the NA, headed by a Lieutenant General, to absorb the integrated combatants. The combatants will have to undergo between three and nine months of training, depending on their ranks. The Directorate would only be deployed for disaster relief, industrial security, development, and forest and environment conservation. On 17 April, the NA stated that it could not start the recruitment process of former Maoist combatants until the structure—leadership and size—of the General Directorate had been finalised at the political level. On 19 April 2012, the three major political parties agreed to merge two separate proposed commissions on Truth and Reconciliation, and on Disappearances, into one.

See also

 Women in the Nepalese Civil War
 Military of Nepal
 2002 Achham incident
 Pir, a controversial song about the war

References

Further reading
Hutt, Michael, Himalayan People's War: Nepal's Maoist Rebellion, (London: Hurst and Co., 2004) .
Jackson, Paul. 2019. "Intelligence in a modern insurgency: the case of the Maoist insurgency in Nepal."  Intelligence and National Security.
Karki, Arjun and David Seddon (eds.), The People's War in Nepal: Left Perspectives, (New Delhi: Adroit, 2003).
Thapa, Deepak, with Bandita Sijapati, A Kingdom Under Siege: Nepal's Maoist Insurgency, 1996–2003, (Kathmandu: The Printhouse, 2003) .

External links
 Nepal's civil war and its subsequent democratic transition by Al Jazeera
 International Center for Transitional Justice, Nepal
Text of all peace accords for Nepal
Crisis briefing on Nepal , Reuters Alertnet 
The Falling Kingdom, a book by Olof Jarlbro
International Crisis Group – Nepal, archive of reports on the Nepalese war and peace processes from the ICG.
Between Two Stones – Nepal's decade of conflict
Maoists of Nepal
International Freedom of Expression eXchange
Insight on Conflict: Peacebuilding database
Nepal: The Improbable Maoists, Foreign Policy Journal
Ten Years of Comprehensive Peace Agreement: Human Rights Situation , National Human Rights Commission, Harihar Bhawan, Lalitpur

 
1990s in Nepal
2000s in Nepal
1997 crimes in Nepal
1990s crimes in Nepal
2000s crimes in Nepal
2006 in Nepal
20th-century conflicts
21st-century conflicts
21st-century rebellions
Civil wars involving the states and peoples of Asia
Civil wars post-1945
Communism in Nepal
Communism-based civil wars
Communist revolutions
Guerrilla wars
History of Nepal (1951–2008)
Maoism in Nepal
Nepalese democracy movements
Politics of Nepal
Revolution-based civil wars
Wars involving Nepal